Heart String Marionette is an independent feature-length animated film directed by M dot Strange. It uses 3D animation and CG effects. The film was released online on June 15, 2012. It premiered on March 7, 2015 at the Cinequest Film Festival.

Plot 
Heart String Marionette is a tale about a child trapped in a box, a masked samurai mime, and a stripper who all try to defeat a warlord and an evil clown, who have successfully turned a countryside into a never ending nightmare filled with horrible monsters. After some opening shots to establish that we know what marionettes are, we open on an island seemingly made of giant stone hands. In the center is a stage, with a large wooden box. A weak voice cries out for help, revealed to be a boy inside the box, accosted by strange laughing statues with clown faces. Eventually, someone shows up to open the door for him and we’re introduced to our hero, Samhaine Tsuke.

Here we get our first bit of plot, rather than visual. The boy claims that he wasn’t looking for someone to let him out of the box, but rather he was in need of an actor, and Samhaine fits the bill perfectly. Samhaine is hesitant, saying he lacks a face, but the boy encourages him, saying that at least he has a voice. The boy commands him to be a hero and tasks Samhaine with hunting down a clown who stole his brother and locked him up in the box, while simultaneously referring to Samhaine as his brother. Samhaine accepts, saying he’ll cut down all the people trying to hurt the boy, “even if I have to kill the Devil himself.” Samhaine leaves and the boy cries out to him, reminding him that style counts for a lot and he should remember to dance.

After that, we’re treated to a few minutes of establishing shots, music, and opening credits as Samhaine makes his way to the local warlord’s mansion. A group of armed men are waiting in the entrance hall as Samhaine enters and presents a picture of the clown given to him by the boy. But there’s no clown present, and the leader of the armed men mocks Samhaine as he struggles to remember who his brother is and what happened to him. Eventually, the men shoot Samhaine in the heart and drag his body off.

Meanwhile, a woman named SiouXsie (Susie) Silen is traveling in a palanquin. She makes conversation with one of the palanquin bearers, asking what the difference is between a marionette and a puppet. He tells her that puppets are controlled from below while marionettes are controlled from above, but that marionettes don’t actually exist. This bit of common sense and exposition ends up being slightly important later on. There’s a short musical interlude where Samhaine is implored to “reach for the sword in his heart,” which he uses to escape from the afterlife. We then get a brief introduction to a wandering archer named Tatsuya, who is pretty much here just for comic relief, a simple man with simple desires: to become a hero so he can pick up chicks.

SiouXsie’s palanquin is attacked by a demon, which kills both of the bearers. As the monster descends on her, Samhaine reappears, wielding the same sword that allowed him to return to life and wearing a different mask from what he had on before. Here we also get our first taste of Samhaine monologuing about his despair and his identity, or lack thereof. This is something that’s going to keep happening for the rest of the movie, and also seems to signal Samhaine having come to embody the “role” he was given by the boy at the beginning. He also claims that to face him is to face his “higher power”, indicating that Samhaine seems to believe he’s a marionette.

Samhaine makes quick work of the demon, and SiouXsie, who believes him to be the Prince of Marionettes, eventually convinces Samhaine to come with her, saying that she has some bodyguard work for him and that she can help him find the clown he’s after. The two set off and encounter numerous bandits and monsters along the way, as well as a couple of children by the riverside singing a song about a little boy born without a face, his father having traded it to the Devil in exchange for immortality. We also learn that the reason all of the puppets wear masks is because it’s believed that the Devil himself is roaming the land, and will steal your soul if he sees your face. Obviously this is all tangential and has nothing to do with what we’re watching. Obviously. Also the warlord’s name is Lord Wor.

Eventually, SiouXsie and Samhaine arrive in SiouXsie’s village, and most of this scene just seems confusing and out of left field. Yes, even by this movie’s standards. The two walk up to the front of a building called “Salvation Saloon” and are soon confronted by a group of men bedecked in crosses who claim that SiouXsie is marked for death and they intend to punish both her and Samhaine for their sins. Samhaine easily wins and SiouXsie takes him to the other side of town to confront the creature these people seem to worship, called The Body. The Body makes his appearance and makes a lot of noise about “the body of Christ” and “the Lord of Lords.” The whole thing seems like it’s set up to be a pretty obvious middle finger to Christianity, except within the context of the movie it doesn’t really make much sense. The Body is just another demon, and the “Lord of Lords” he claims to represent is Lord Wor, a man who works for the Devil.

As Samhaine fights The Body, SiouXsie is kidnapped by the Waspwoman, another one of Lord Wor’s demons. Luckily, Tatsuya has been stalking SiouXsie for quite some time and manages to save her. After releasing her from her cage, he asks her about the man she’s traveling with and she reveals that he’s Samhaine Tsuke. Tatsuya releases his inner fanboy upon hearing this, relating the story of an old play known as “The Silent Form,” written by Samhaine Tsuke. Found a long time ago in a cave, the author is unknown apart from the signature on the cover. However, the events of the play mirror the events of the movie. So that’s a thing.

Having defeated The Body, Samhaine realizes that SiouXsie is missing. He wanders along the road, searching for her, eventually finding her in another village after dispatching some more of Lord Wor’s demons. Samhaine has some kind of breakdown, wondering if he’s real. SiouXsie flirts with him/tries to steal his sword, but Samhaine rejects her advances, saying he’s not a man, but a monster. Samhaine wanders off alone into the countryside, bemoaning his fate as a puppet destined to follow the script of the play. SiouXsie also wanders off and encounters the Waspwoman in a graveyard, revealed to be Samhaine’s mother, having been turned into a monster by Lord Wor. The two talk for a while before Waspwoman takes SiouXsie to Lord Wor.

Tatsuya tracks down Samhaine and they both make their way to stately Wor Manor to save SiouXsie and face off against Lord Wor. Samhaine cuts a bloody swathe through Wor’s men, monologuing through most of the battle, before making his way into the mansion. Tatsuya ends up locked out.

Samhaine confronts Lord Wor, his father, who apologizes for having wronged him in the past. Samhaine surrenders to Lord Wor, and they make their way to the conveniently placed Hell portal in the back of the mansion. Lord Wor calls out to the Devil, saying that they’ve come to release him. The Devil, speaking in a foreign language, declares that his physical form has deteriorated and he requires a new vessel. He wants Samhaine’s body.

The Devil, who resembles a brine shrimp, asks Samhaine to remove his mask to complete the process. But as he does, the Devil stares into Samhaine’s faceless…face, declaring that he does have a face and is something monstrous. Lord Wor doesn’t understand why Samhaine has a face as he, “made sure he died inside.” Samhaine proceeds to beat the Devil to death with his bare hands as Wor approaches him, and we get a silent scene of Samhaine’s childhood, abused and beaten by Wor, who is revealed to be the clown from the picture given to Samhaine by the boy. After this, Wor retreats back through the portal as Hell collapses around Samhaine. Another demon appears, and Samhaine gives a monologue about hate before cutting it down, his sword now having his heart prominently displayed on the blade.

Samhaine comes back through the portal, declaring himself to be a monster of his father’s own creation. Wor agrees, and apologizes, saying that he’ll atone by burning down his mansion and abandoning the machines that give him eternal life. But as Samhaine approaches Wor, his heart ceases beating on the sword and he collapses. Wor transforms into the clown and stomps Samhaine’s motionless heart into dust.

What follows is an emotional musical scene where the boy offers up his heart to replace the one Samhaine has lost. Samhaine cuts down Wor, who thanks him for freeing him as he dies, happy that Samhaine has ended the cycle and will never become his father. The life flows from Wor, reviving all those he’d stolen life from across the land. Samhaine cries over his father’s remains before turning to bow to the people assembled behind him, and the astonishingly short credits roll. Interestingly enough, the musical part of this scene is missing from the Uberector’s Cut. In that version, Wor destroying Samhaine’s heart leads directly into the credits, which then cuts straight to Samhaine killing Wor, with no sort of explanation given.

"The narrative of Heart String Marionette does not follow the narrative conventions of traditional films. The narrative style of the film is based on a type of Japanese theater called Noh. One of the premises of Noh as explained by its creator Zeami is that emotion is more important than the ability to lay out a clear cause and effect story. M dot Strange studied the principles of Noh as written by Zeami in creating Heart String Marionette. The film has more similarities with Noh than it does with a mainstream Hollywood film.".

Production
Voices are provided by Jimmy Urine, JP Anderson, Richard Grove, Asil Aceves, Tanja Björk and others.

There are two versions of Heart String Marionette. The Original Cut features original music by composer Endika and was a close collaboration between director and composer. The Director's Cut is a different version of the film, scored by M dot Strange, that features various scenes that are not in the Original Cut, as well as having some scenes from the Original Cut removed. The Original Cut of the film can be found on YouTube.

Technical aspects
What is unusual about this film is that it is essentially the work of one person, M dot Strange. Although created using simple techniques compared to many films with computer-generated imagery, (e.g. almost all characters are derived from the same basic figure) this movie has a professional aspect, due in large part to the results obtained through the use of Cinema 4D. The movie contains more than 1,500 shots that were created entirely in Cinema 4D. In addition,  After Effects software was used for compositing. The film took two and half years to complete. There is a companion book A_Book which highlights the making of the film with a lot of how to tips for DIY animators/filmmakers.

Release 
The film was released digitally online on June 15, 2012. The Original Cut of the film was screened at the Cinequest Film Festival on March 7, 2015.

See also 
 List of animated feature films
 List of computer-animated films
 We Are the Strange

References

External links 
 Official web site
 Companion book, Making of Heart String Marionette 
 
 Heart String Marionette at Rotten Tomatoes
 Heart String Marionette at Cinequest Film Festival
 Teaser Teaser 2
 Official trailer

2012 animated films
2012 films
American animated feature films
American independent films
2010s American films